Manchili is a village in West Godavari district in the state of Andhra Pradesh in India.

Demographics
 India census, Manchili has a population of 5422 of which 2732 are males while 2690 are females. The average sex ratio of Manchili village is 985. The child population is 490, which makes up 9.04% of the total population of the village, with sex ratio 914. In 2011, the literacy rate of Manchili village was 75.39% when compared to 67.02% of Andhra Pradesh.

See also 
 Eluru

References 

Villages in West Godavari district